Peter Hill (born 4 February 1950) is a retired Church of England bishop who served as Bishop of Barking (an area bishop in the Diocese of Chelmsford), 2014–2021. He was previously Archdeacon of Nottingham, 2007–2014.

Early life and education
Hill grew up in Swansea and studied at the University of Manchester, then the University of Nottingham. He spent eight years teaching in Manchester before training for the ministry at Wycliffe Hall, Oxford.

Ordained ministry
Hill was made a deacon at Petertide 1983 (3 July) and ordained a priest the Petertide next (1 July 1984) — both times by Denis Wakeling, Bishop of Southwell, at Southwell Minster.

He was curate of St James' Church, Porchester in Nottingham from 1983 to 1986 and Vicar of All Saints' Church, Huthwaite from 1986 to 1995. Appointed Priest-in-Charge of St Wilfrid's Church, Calverton in 1995 he also served as Area Dean of Southwell from 1997 to 2001. He moved from both posts in 2004 to be Chief Executive of the Diocese of Southwell and Nottingham. He was consecrated a bishop on 25 July 2014, by Justin Welby, Archbishop of Canterbury, at St Paul's Cathedral; he is also currently Vice Chair of the Dioceses Commission.

Ahead of Stephen Cottrell's translation from Chelmsford to York, Hill became (additionally) Acting diocesan Bishop of Chelmsford on Easter Day, 12 April 2020. That role ended on 19 April 2021. Hill then retired effective 4 August 2021.

Peter is now an associate minister at the Parish Church of St. Mary Magdalene in Newark on Trent.

References

1950 births
Bishops of Barking
Alumni of the University of Nottingham
Alumni of the University of Manchester
Alumni of Wycliffe Hall, Oxford
Archdeacons of Nottingham
Living people
People from Morriston